Theodore M. Kyriakou (born 1974) is a Greek businessman, the CEO of ANT1 Group, the largest Greek media company, which was owned by his father Minos Kyriakou until his death in July 2017.

Theodore Kyriakou was born in 1974, the son of Minos Kyriakou and his first wife.

He has a degree in International Business and Finance and a degree in Physics, from Georgetown University.

References

1974 births
Living people